Michael Edwards (born 10 September 1974) is a former English footballer, who played as a midfielder in the Football League and Championship for Tranmere Rovers F.C., Mansfield Town F.C., Darlington F.C, Shamrock Rovers F.C., Stalybridge Celtic F.C., Northwich Victoria F.C., Vauxhall Motors F.C., Rhyl FC, and Caernarfon Town F.C.

References

External links

Tranmere Rovers F.C. players
Rhyl F.C. players
Association football midfielders
English Football League players
Living people
1974 births
English footballers
Mansfield Town F.C. players
Stalybridge Celtic F.C. players
Northwich Victoria F.C. players
Vauxhall Motors F.C. players
Caernarfon Town F.C. players